Legend of Ban Shu  is a 2015 Chinese television series starring Jing Tian in the title role of Ban Shu, alongside Zhang Zhehan, Fu Xinbo, Li Jiahang, Li Xinai and Deng Sha. It was produced by Yu Zheng, as a counterpart to his 2013 television series Legend of Lu Zhen. The series first premiered on Sichuan terrestrial channel in China on October 6, 2015; and was later broadcast nationwide on CCTV on February 6, 2016.

The drama received positive reviews.

Synopsis
Ban Shu, a girl who grew up in the western frontier, traveled to the Han capital to meet her father, but he died before they could be reunited and his family did not approve of her due to her background. In order to be accepted by her father's family, she entered the palace to learn proper etiquette and was hired to be an imperial scholar. Her lack of understanding for the Chinese culture caused a stream of comedic ruckus in class, but at the same time her outgoing and unconventional ways brightens up the dull atmosphere of the academy. At the palace she meets and fall in love with fellow professor Wei Ying, who is still grieving for his ex-fiancee. Her vivaciousness and bright personality slowly touches him and allows him to forget about his past love.

Cast

Main

 Jing Tian as Ban Shu
 Daughter of Ban Chao and princess of Shanshan County. A free-spirited girl who grew up in the grasslands. She later entered the palace and became a scholar to prove her identity as Ban Chao's daughter.
 Zhang Zhehan as Wei Ying
 Descendant of military general Wei Qing. A cold and distant man. Because of the accident of his previous fiancee Liu Xuan, he grew to dislike outlanders. He used to be a capable general, but to an accident, decides to become a scholar in the palace's academy.
 Fu Xinbo as Huo Heng/Huo Xuan
 Huo Heng is the commander of the Eastern Han's imperial army. An intelligent and courageous man. He loves Yao Juan, and would sacrifice anything for her. Huo Xuan is Huo Heng's twin brother. A cunning and crafty man. He loves Deng Sui.
 Li Jiahang as Deng Zhi
 Brother of Deng Sui. Great General Cheqi. Kou Lanzhi's fiancee. He used to love Ban Shu and Yue Jin.
 Li Xinai as Kou Lanzhi
 Daughter of Fulu Marquis. Known as the most talented girl in the capital. She later became a scholar in the palace academy, and became rivals with Ban Shu.
 Deng Sha as Yao Juan
 Ban Zhao's renowned disciple. A scholar in the palace academy. She loves Huo Heng, and is a close friend of Ban Shu. She has extremely poor eyesight.

Supporting

Palace academy

 Tien Niu as Ban Zhao
 A renowned historian and scholar. Ban Shu's aunt, Deng Sui's teacher.
 Zhang Xinyu as Liu Xuan (Mo Chou)
 Ban Zhao's senior disciple, and the top female professor in the inner palace academy. She used to be Wei Ying's lover, but was sent to the Southern Lands due to a marriage arrangement with King Zuoxian.
 Zhang Yijie as Liu Hong
 Son of Prince Zhongshan. Student of Professor Wei.
 Zhang Xueying as Liu Yan
 Princess Beixiang. Daughter of Prince Zhongshan. An unruly and spoilt girl who likes Wei Ying, and treats Ban Shu as a rival.
 Guan Xiaotong as Jiang Xiu
 Elder mistress of Lanling Order's Jiang manor.
 Jiang Yiyi as Jiang Ling
 Second mistress of Lanling Order's Jiang manor.
 Kang Ning as Liu Xing
 Princess Wenxi. A girl with weak health but a kind heart.
 Merxat as Kou Feng
 Brother of Kou Lanzhi. He likes An Xin, and dislikes Ban Shu due to her rivalry with his sister.
 Sun Yi as Ah Cen
 Daughter of Grand Herald Lin. Kou Lanzhi's most favored student.
 Fan Linlin as He Hui
 Daughter of the provincial governor.
 Zheng Danlei as Ah Xiang
 Liu Yan's close friend.
 Gao Yu'er as Ah Shuang
 Gao Jicai as Zhu Ding
 Son of Glorious Grand Master Zhu Mingtang.
 Chen Long as Li Yong
 Son of Guannei Marquis Li Guang.
 Xiao Yuyu as Xia Wenji
 Daughter of the Education Minister. A female professor who entered the Academy at the same time as Ban Shu, but was scared away by the rowdy students.

Imperial family

 Li Sheng as Deng Sui
 Empress Dowager Deng. She has a forbidden love with Huo Xuan.
 Wang Peidong as Liu Hu
 Emperor An.
 Wang Jialin as Liu Wu
 Prince Liang. He aims to overthrow Deng Sui.
 Xiang Yicheng as Princess Yunxiu

Servants

 Wang Shuang as Court Lady Ming
 Personal attendant of Deng Sui.
 Shao Min as Wang Sheng
 Wet nurse of the Emperor. She often encourages the Emperor to go against Deng Sui. She treats Kou Lanzhi as a younger sister.
 Kent Tong as Uncle Zhong
 Loyal servant of Ban family.
 Wen Wen as Pei Huan
 Personal attendant of Ban Shu.
 Cao Xinyue as Bi Yu
 Personal attendant of Kou Lanzhi.
 Zeng Yixuan as Jin Shu
 Attendant of the inner academy hall.

Court officials

 Lu Yong as Yang Zhen
 Minister of Eastern Han.
 Wang Jianxin as Marquis Kou
 Fulu Marquis. A renowned scholar. Kou Lanzhi and Kou Feng's father. He is in cahoots with Prince Liang, and aims to overthrow Deng Sui.
 Qiu Xinzhi as Zhu Mingtang
 Glorious grand master. Zhu Ding's father.
 Yang Long as Qin Huai
 Deng Zhi's subordinate.
 Zhang Jia as Ban Yong
 Sima General. Ban Shu's brother.
 Zhuo Fan as Jiang Chongdong
 Investigating Censor of Lan Tai. Jiang Xiu and Jiang Ling's father.
 Hu Pu as Bai Chengen
 A general.
 Yue Dongfeng as Minister Cai
 In charge of the purchasing orders of the palace.
 Wang Maolei as Zhen Jian
 A general. Princess Yunxiu's husband.
 Ya Jiahui as Du Zhong
 Minister of Ye Ting Order.

People of Han kingdom

 Hei Zi as Lord Nanyang
 Wang Lin as Lady Nanyang
 Jiao Junyan as Ah Yue
 Courtesan of Hongxiang Court. Deng Zhi's close confidant.
 Johnny Zhang as Song Cheng
 Military captain of Xiliu Camp. Jiang Xiu's lover.
 Zang Hongna as Yin Xiu
 A girl who likes Huo Heng.
 Kristy Yang as Zhu Ding's mother.
 He Yanni as Miao Rouniang
 Zhu Mintang's second wife.

Others

 Gao Yunxiang as Su Li
 Leader of the Inner Mongolias' Bandits. He likes Ban Shu.
 Zhang Meng as Yue Jin
 A songstress who came from the Northern Lands. Deng Zhi's crush.
 Kang Lei as An Ping
 Prince of Loulan Kingdom.
 Dilraba Dilmurat as An Xin
 Princess of Loulan Kingdom. She likes  Kou Feng.
 Ji Chen as Mo Dong
 A businessman from the Northern Lands.
 Gao Weiguang as King Zuoxian
 Ruler of Inner Mongolias' Southern Lands. Liu Xuan's husband.
 Li Yilin as Prince of South
 Leader of Inner Mongolias' Southern Lands. Brother of  King Zuoxian.
 Zhang Yameng as Consort Dowager
 Mother of King Zuoxian.
 Kun Enpan as Ah Zhu
 Personal attendant of King Zuoxian.

Soundtrack 
The soundtrack was released on October 10, 2015.

Ratings 

 Highest ratings are marked in red, lowest ratings are marked in blue

References

Chinese historical television series
2015 Chinese television series debuts
2015 Chinese television series endings
Television series set in the Eastern Han dynasty
China Central Television original programming
Television series by Huanyu Film
Television series set in the 2nd century